This is a list of UC Riverside Highlanders football players in the NFL Draft.

Key

Selections

References

UC Riverside

UC Riverside Highlanders NFL Draft